Bosqueville Independent School District is a public school district in Bosqueville, McLennan County, Texas (USA). The district operates one high school, Bosqueville High School.

Finances
As of the 2010–2011 school year, the appraised valuation of property in the district was $122,746,000. The maintenance tax rate was $0.117 and the bond tax rate was $0.038 per $100 of appraised valuation.

Academic achievement
In 2011, the school district was rated "academically acceptable" by the Texas Education Agency.  Forty-nine percent of districts in Texas in 2011 received the same rating. No state accountability ratings will be given to districts in 2012. A school district in Texas can receive one of four possible rankings from the Texas Education Agency: Exemplary (the highest possible ranking), Recognized, Academically Acceptable, and Academically Unacceptable (the lowest possible ranking).

Historical district TEA accountability ratings
2011: Academically Acceptable
2010: Recognized
2009: Recognized
2008: Academically Acceptable
2007: Recognized
2006: Recognized
2005: Academically Acceptable
2004: Recognized

Schools
In the 2011–2012 school year, the district had students in four schools.
Regular instructional
Bosqueville High School (Grades 6-12)
Bosqueville Elementary (Grades Pre-K-5)
JJAEP instructional
Challenge Academy (Grades 6-12)
DAEP instructional
Bosqueville DAEP (Grades 5-12)

Special programs

Athletics
Bosqueville High School participates in the boys sports of baseball, basketball, football, and wrestling. The school participates in the girls sports of basketball, softball, and volleyball. For the 2012 through 2014 school years, Bosqueville High School will play football in UIL Class 1A Division I.

See also

List of school districts in Texas
List of high schools in Texas

References

External links
Bosqueville ISD

School districts in McLennan County, Texas